Ihaddadene (Tarifit: Iḥeddaden, ⵉⵃⴻⴷⴷⴰⴷⴻⵏ; Arabic:  إحدادن) is a commune in the Nador Province of the Oriental administrative region of Morocco. At the time of the 2004 census, the commune had a total population of 26,582 people living in 5119 households.

References

Populated places in Nador Province
Rural communes of Oriental (Morocco)